Three Treasures or Three Jewels may refer to:
Three Jewels (Buddhism), Buddha, Dharma and Sangha (Sanskrit: triratna, Pali: tiratana)
Three Treasures (Taoism), compassion, frugality and humility
Three Jewels of Jainism,  right view, right knowledge and right conduct
Three Treasures (traditional Chinese medicine), jing, qi and shen
Three Treasures (Yiguandao), mystic portal, true sutra and hand seal 
Three ancestral treasures, the three items passed down each generation within Chinese culture
The Silmarils, the three jewels after which The Silmarillion is named
The Three Treasures, a 1959 Japanese film also known as The Birth of Japan
A short story collection by Ryūnosuke Akutagawa
The , or the Imperial Regalia of Japan
The three Buddhist majority-federal subjects of Russia, Buryatia, Kalmykia and Tuva